Jeb A. Bardon is an American businessman and politician from Indiana. Bardon currently serves as the Wayne Township Trustee. Previously, Bardon was a Democratic member of the Indiana House of Representatives, representing the 25th District from 1998 to 2012.

Bardon began running to be the next Wayne Township Trustee during Fall 2021. Bardon won the 2022 Democrat Primary Election and is preparing for the General Election on Tuesday, November 8, 2022.

After the resignation of Trustee Jones, Bardon was elected by Democrat caucus to fill the remainder of Jones' term (from July 2022 to January 2023). Most recently as Trustee, Bardon has appointed a new Fire Chief, Marcus Reed, and expanded access to school uniform assistance.

In his free time, Jeb volunteers for organizations, including Reconnecting to Our Waterways - Little Eagle Creek and the International Marketplace Coalition.

References

External links
Jeb Bardon for Wayne Township Trustee, Official Campaign Website
State Representative Jeb Bardon official Indiana State Legislature site

Democratic Party members of the Indiana House of Representatives
Living people
Politicians from Indianapolis
Year of birth missing (living people)